Mohammad Alam (born 1 March 1982) is a Pakistani first-class cricketer who played for Quetta cricket team.

References

External links
 

1982 births
Living people
Pakistani cricketers
Quetta cricketers
Cricketers from Quetta